

Lake Pelku, Pelkhu, or Paiku
is a lake at  elevation on the Tibetan Plateau in Shigatse Prefecture.

It is surrounded by mountains reaching . Streams fed by glaciers cascade to the valley floor, but most sink into alluvial deposits before reaching the lake.

The surrounding catchment is an endorheic basin with no outlet.  It would overflow into the Yarlung Tsangpo with a water level about  higher.  The lake's brackish water is evidence that it has not overflowed in hundreds, if not thousands, of years.

Climate

Notes

References

Bibliography
National Aeronautics and Space Administration
 
 

Palku
Shigatse
Gyirong County
Saga County
Nyalam County